Nicanor Garcia Street, historically known as Calle Reposo or Reposo Street, is a street running for several hundred meters north of Gil Puyat Avenue in Bel-Air Village, Makati, Metro Manila, Philippines. It crosses Jupiter Street/Metropolitan Avenue and Kalayaan Avenue, ending at J.P. Rizal Avenue along the barangay boundaries of Poblacion and Valenzuela. It has a short extension into Rizal Village, named as Antipolo Street. The street is notable for its art galleries, interior design showrooms, and fine dining restaurants.

Nicanor Garcia forms the border between Bel-Air Village and the under-construction Makati Columbarium, which sits on the former Makati Catholic Cemetery, in barangay Valenzuela and between barangays Valenzuela and Poblacion. It was originally called Calle Reposo (Spanish for rest or repose), and was also called Calle Plesantero (pleasant place) by earlier residents. Its origin traces back to an access road connecting the Makati Catholic Cemetery to the rest of Makati. In the 1990s, the road was renamed to Nicanor Garcia Street, after Nicanor F. Garcia, the first elected municipal mayor of Makati who served from 1922 to 1934.

An artists' association called "Grupo Reposo" composed of the street's gallery and store owners holds an annual street art and culture festival on Nicanor Garcia Street. The group aims to make the old Calle Reposo an art center and the city's cultural hub.

Landmarks

 Alliance Française de Manille
 Caffe Maestro
 Caruso Ristorante Italiano
 Casa Ligna
 Jazz Residences
 Libertystile 
 LRI Design Plaza
 Makati Catholic Cemetery graffiti
 Mapúa University Makati Campus (former site)
 PJL Commercial Center
 R Space Events Venue
 Ristorante L'Ambasciata d'Abruzzo
 St. Andrew the Apostle Parish
 SPi Global

References

Streets in Metro Manila
Restaurant districts and streets in the Philippines